Yannick Cereso Frederik Leliendal (born 23 April 2002) is a Dutch footballer who plays for Jong Utrecht in the Eerste Divisie as a full back.

Early life
Leliendal was born in the Netherlands, but grew up in Belgium. He started at KSK Tongeren before he joined the youth academy of KRC Genk in 2014.

Career
Following a successful trial period with VVV Venlo he signed a two-year contract on 16 July 2021. On 8 August, 2021 in the first league match of the season against NAC Breda he made his professional debut in a 2-2 draw. Leliendal scored his first goal for VVV on 26 October 2021 against NAC Brada in the KNVB Cup. At the end of January 2022 transfer window he was loaned for the rest of the season to TOP Oss. Leliendal commented that this move was a success and he was able to get playing minutes and was able to develop as a player. He signed a one-year contract with an option for an additional season with Jong Utrecht in July 2022 after being released VVV.

International career
Leliendal has played for both the Belgian and Dutch national youth teams in age group football. He was part of the Netherlands national under-17 football team that reached the semifinals at the 2019 FIFA U-17 World Cup in Brazil.

References

External links
 

2002 births
Living people
Dutch footballers
Association football defenders
Eerste Divisie players
Netherlands youth international footballers
Belgium youth international footballers